Igor Anatolyevich Surin (born 19 November 1974) is a former Russian professional footballer.

Club career
He made his debut in the Russian Premier League during 1996 for FC Lokomotiv Nizhny Novgorod.

External links
 

1974 births
Living people
Russian footballers
FC Lokomotiv Nizhny Novgorod players
Russian Premier League players
Association football defenders
FC Sheksna Cherepovets players